Pavel Timofeevich Tarasov (21 September 1914 — 29 July 1944) was a Soviet fighter pilot during World War II. Awarded the title Hero of the Soviet Union on 13 April 1944 for his victories, by the time of his death his tally stood at 31 solo plus and one shared shootdowns.

References 

1914 births
1944 deaths
Soviet World War II flying aces
Heroes of the Soviet Union
Recipients of the Order of Lenin
Recipients of the Order of the Red Banner
Soviet military personnel killed in World War II